Albert Stirn (born 13 September 1903, date of death unknown) was a Luxembourgian footballer. He played in two matches for the Luxembourg national football team in 1924.

References

External links

1903 births
Year of death missing
Luxembourgian footballers
Luxembourg international footballers
Place of birth missing
Association football defenders
CA Spora Luxembourg players